Upali Tennakoon is a Sri Lankan journalist. He was the founding editor of the Sinhala language newspaper Rivira. He was earlier the editor of Divina. He was attacked on 23 January 2009 by four men on motorbikes along with  wife Dhammika with knives and sticks. Tennakoon had written an article about a high-ranking army official before the attack. After the attack he went into exile to the United States. His wife Dhammika works with the University Grants Commission.

References

Living people
Year of birth missing (living people)
Sri Lankan journalists